Nervilia concolor, commonly known as the tall shield orchid and as Nervilia aragoana in Australia is a small terrestrial orchid found in South and Southeast Asia and in northern Australia. It has pale green, short-lived flowers with a cream-coloured or yellowish labellum and a more or less circular leaf which emerges at the base of the flowering stem after flowering.

Description
Nervilia concolor is a terrestrial, perennial, deciduous, sympodial herb which grows in colonies with only a few individuals producing flowers in any one year. The labellum has three lobes and is cream-coloured or yellowish with hairy purple or green veins. The side lobes curl inwards and the middle lobe has wavy edges and three hairy ridges. The flowers only last up to four days, following which a single leaf develops, including on those plants that did not flower. The leaf is bright green, heart-shaped or kidney-shaped but appears almost circular,  in diameter with wavy edges and prominent radiating veins. In Australia, flowering occurs between September and December after heavy rain but in areas north of the equator in April and May.

Taxonomy and naming
The tall shield orchid was first formally described in 1825 by Carl Ludwig Blume who gave it the name Cordyla concolor and published the description in Bijdragen tot de flora van Nederlandsch Indië. In 1825 Rudolf Schlechter changed the name to Nervilia concolor. The specific epithet (concolor) is a Latin word meaning "coloured uniformly".

In Australia the species is known as Nervilia aragoana, first described in 1827 by Charles Gaudichaud-Beaupré.

The species is known by a variety of vernacular names in Asia:
Malaysia:  Daun sa-helai sa-tahun, daun satu tahun (Peninsular).
Thailand:  Phaen din yen (Chiang Rai), waan phra chim (Bangkok).
Vietnam:   Ch[aa]n tr[aa]u xanh, thanh thi[ee]n q[uf]y, Ian c[owf].
Japan: Yaeyama-kuma-sô, aoi-bokuro

Distribution and habitat
Nervilia concolor occurs in Nepal, Bhutan, eastern India, Myanmar, Indochina, southern China, Taiwan, southern Japan, Thailand, the Malaysian region, the Pacific Islands, Queensland and the Northern Territory. It grows in forest, rainforest and monsoonal rainforest.

References

External links 
The Internet Orchid Species Photo Encyclopedia

concolor
Plants described in 1826
Orchids of Myanmar
Orchids of India
Orchids of Indonesia
Orchids of Laos
Orchids of Malaysia
Orchids of New Guinea
Orchids of Australia
Orchids of Thailand
Taxa named by Carl Ludwig Blume